The King Frederick Augustus Tower is the only preserved observation tower of cast iron in Europe and perhaps the oldest tower built of iron. It is located on the Löbauer Berg at Löbau in Saxony, offering a panoramic view of the Zittau Hills and the Upper Lusatia region. The tower was built in 1854 by the Löbau citizens and named after King Frederick Augustus II of Saxony.

It was designed by Friedrich August Bretschneider jr. after The Crystal Palace in Hyde Park, London, with its erection costing 25.000 Taler. Construction works started on May 18, 1854 after preparation of ground had started on January 12. On September 9 it was inaugurated, shortly after King Frederick had died on vacation in Tyrol. In 1993, it was dismantled and its parts were thoroughly restored, with the original structure being rebuilt the following year.

See also
 Cast-iron architecture
 List of towers

External links

References

Observation towers in Saxony
Towers completed in 1854
Buildings and structures in Saxony
Löbau
Buildings and structures in Görlitz (district)